Cornelis Evertsen the Youngest, 16 November 1642 to 16 November 1706, was a Dutch naval officer from Vlissingen who served as Lieutenant Admiral of Zeeland and Supreme Commander of the Confederated Dutch Navy. He is often confused with his cousin, Cornelis Evertsen the Younger.

Biography
Cornelis was born in Vlissingen as the second son of Lieutenant-Admiral Cornelis Evertsen the Elder. He was a nephew of Lieutenant-Admiral Johan Evertsen and cousin of the latter's son Vice-Admiral Cornelis Evertsen the Younger, with whom he is very often confused. Cornelis was nicknamed Keesje den Duvel ("Little Cornelis the Devil") for his cantankerous and hot-tempered character, which he shared with his father. He followed the Protestant Synod of Dort.

Second Anglo-Dutch War
Already at the age of ten, in 1652, Cornelis sailed on his father's ship. He became privateer in 1665 during the Second Anglo-Dutch War and was captured by the English on 15 April of that year when his force of two ships was defeated by three English vessels, among them the Diamond and the Yarmouth. His crew had to bodily restrain him to prevent him from blowing up his ship, the Eendragt of 32 cannon. Because of his famous father and uncle he was considered worthy of royal interest. During interrogation the brother of the king, Lord High Admiral James, the Duke of York, inquired about a bullet hole in the top of Cornelis's hat, asking the captain to excuse the English for having damaged his clothing. Cornelis grumpily answered that he was proud of the hole; only he would have preferred it to have been a bit lower, to now being a prisoner.

John Evelyn recounts how Cornelis was on 24 April 1665 released for his wit by Charles II of England in person: Cornelis having been admitted into the royal bedchamber, His Majesty gave him his hand to kiss, and restored him his liberty; asked many questions concerning the fight (it being the first blood drawn), his Majesty remembering the many civilities he had formerly received from his relations abroad — this was a reference to the support the Evertsen family had given Charles during his exile. Evelyn was then commanded to go with him to the Holland Ambassador, where he was to stay for his passport, and I was to give him 50 pieces in broad gold. Charles this way not only repaid old favours shown, but also tried to sow dissension between the staunchly orangist province of Zealand and the republican province of Holland; he pretended to champion the cause of the young William III of Orange.

After his return in 1665 Cornelis fought in the Battle of Lowestoft; in July he became captain with the Admiralty of Zealand. In 1666 Cornelis was captain of his father's flagship Walcheren during the Four Days Battle. During the first night he witnessed his father's death, the Lieutenant-Admiral being cut in two by the parting shot of the escaping Henry. He also fought in the St. James's Day Battle where his uncle was killed.

Third Anglo-Dutch War
Before the war had officially began, the English clandestinely sent Sir Robert Holmes with a fleet of warships under the guise of a private enterprise called the Company of Royal Adventurers (CRA) to attempt capture of the rich returning Dutch Smyrna merchant fleet. Evertsen was in command of the naval escort fleet which successfully repelled Holmes' unprovoked attack. That action along with the CRA seizing Dutch African Gold Coast slave trading forts and settlements became the casus belli which started the war. 

At the Battle of Solebay he commanded the Zwanenburg (44 guns) (the captured English frigate formerly Saint Patrick). In 1673, along with Jacob Binckes, their combined fleet of 21 warships raided the English and French Antilles from Barbados to Nevis capturing over a dozen vessels. They reinforced Dutch Surinam with soldiers and supplies and retook Saba and St Eustatius which had been seized by the English earlier in the war. The expedition then sailed to the English North American colonial coast, first attacking Hampton Roads (approaching with false English colors) and capturing or destroying most of the combined Maryland and Virginia tobacco fleet which had just been loaded and assembled for its annual voyage to London (a value of over 240,000 guilders). They landed marines and torched several plantations before moving north to reconquer New Netherland, including New Amsterdam, as Vice-Admiral of a fleet in service of the Dutch West India Company, the Swaenenburgh still his flagship. The final act of the expedition was raiding the Newfoundland fisheries. They destroyed a fort and several fine homes as well as the fisheries themselves and took prisoners. A large number of fishing boats were destroyed and several large merchantmen full of fish were captured. In all, the expedition had captured 34 prizes before heading back to Europe. The expedition sailed to Cadiz before returning to the Netherlands where in an odd ship to ship duel, a single battle of honor took place between the English Tiger and one of Evertsen's ships, the Schakerloo. The English ship was victorious and unknown to all present the battle actually took place a day after the war was over - making it the last battle of the Third Anglo-Dutch War. When he returned in July 1674, he was accused of disobedience, because the government of Zealand were not enthusiastic about his conquest seeing the colony as too expensive to maintain; his real orders had been to conquer Saint Helena and Cayenne but this had not occurred due to a superior English naval force present at Saint Helena. New York was ceded by treaty back to England in exchange for the English abandoning all forts, towns and claims to Surinam, making it exclusively Dutch, as well as ceding the tiny Banda spice islands of Ai and Run to the Dutch giving them a complete monopoly on the Spice Trade.

Rear-Admiral of Zealand
In January 1675 Cornelis became Rear-Admiral of Zealand. In 1677 he commanded a blockade against the Dunkirkers. On 20 September 1679 he replaced his deceased cousin Cornelis the Younger as Vice-Admiral of Zealand; he became on 1 April 1684 Lieutenant-Admiral of Zealand and supreme commander of the confederate Dutch fleet, replacing Cornelis Tromp. In 1688 he commanded the vanguard of the invasion fleet of stadtholder William III during the Glorious Revolution.

In 1690 Cornelis was commander of the vanguard of the allied Anglo-Dutch fleet at the Battle of Beachy Head(French: Battle of Beveziers). As commander of the Van, his force made contact with a far superior French force at the beginning of the battle and with only 20 warships he held off the onslaught of 75 French ships with no help from Lord Torrington (the supreme allied admiral) who was unwilling to commit the main and rear of the battle line in engaging the enemy. Evertsen saved the majority of his squadron outfoxing the French by suddenly anchoring while under full sail, allowing the enemy fleet to be carried away with the tidal stream before they realized what was happening. The French then pursued the remainer of the English fleet which retreated back to the Medway. Torrington was brought up on charges after the battle and relieved as supreme admiral of the Royal Navy - never commanding again. 

In that same year Evertsen was replaced as supreme commander by Tromp, who soon died and was replaced by Philips van Almonde.

Cornelis, after 1690 never again commanding a fleet, died in 1706 and is buried in Middelburg. He was succeeded as Lieutenant-Admiral of Zealand by his younger brother Geleyn Evertsen.

Personal life
Cornelis never married, nor is it known that he ever had a relationship with a woman.

References

17th-century Dutch military personnel
Admirals of the navy of the Dutch Republic
Dutch naval personnel of the Anglo-Dutch Wars
1642 births
1706 deaths
People from Vlissingen
People of New Netherland
Dutch military personnel of the Nine Years' War